The 2014 Advantage Cars Prague Open,  also known as Advantage Cars Prague Open by I. ČLTK Praha for sponsorship reasons, was a professional tennis tournament played on clay courts. It was the 21st edition of the tournament which was part of the 2014 ATP Challenger Tour. It took place in Prague, Czech Republic between 4 and 10 August 2014.

ATP entrants

Seeds

 1 Rankings are as of July 28, 2014.

Other entrants
The following players received wildcards into the singles main draw:
  Dušan Lojda
  Adrian Sikora
  David Simunek
  Robin Stanek

The following player received a special exemption into the singles main draw:
  Yang Tsung-hua

The following player entered into the singles main draw as an alternate:
  Alex Bolt

The following players received entry from the qualifying draw:
  Miki Janković 
  Jozef Kovalík 
  Thiago Monteiro
  Tomáš Papik

Champions

Singles

 Diego Schwartzman def.  André Ghem 6–4, 7–5

Doubles

 Toni Androić /  Andrey Kuznetsov def.  Roberto Maytín /  Miguel Ángel Reyes-Varela 7–5, 7–5

External links
ITF Search
ATP official site

Advantage Cars Prague Open
Advantage Cars Prague Open
Advantage Cars Prague Open